Dreams Can Come True, Greatest Hits Vol. 1 is a greatest hits album by English recording artist Gabrielle. It was released in 2001, featuring all of Gabrielle's biggest hit singles. The compilation album went on to become the fifth-best-selling album of 2001 in the United Kingdom, achieving 4× platinum. It was the 76th-best-selling album of that decade in the UK.

Track listing

Notes
 "I Wish" and "Walk On By" are not included on some versions of the album.

Charts

Weekly charts

Year-end charts

Certifications

References

2001 greatest hits albums
Gabrielle (singer) albums
Albums produced by Richard Stannard (songwriter)